Blank Manuskript is an art rock project from Salzburg, Austria. They are usually described as Progressive Rock with a certain focus towards contemporary rock program music. They are known for their exotical costumes on stage and their almost theatre-like performances. The band members are all multiinstrumentalists and play many different instruments on stage. They have released three studio albums so far, which are all concept albums. They have been on numeral European tours with a special focus towards England.

Band members
 Jakob Aistleitner – Saxophone, Flute, Electric Guitar, Glockenspiel, Percussion, Vocals
 Peter Baxrainer – Electric Guitar, Acoustic Guitar, Vocals
 Jakob Sigl – Drums, Percussion, Viola, Tape, Vocals
 Dominik Wallner – Piano, Electric Piano, Organ, Synthesizer, Vocals
 Alfons Wohlmuth – Electric Bass, Flute, Vocals

Discography

Albums
 Tales from an Island - Impressions from Rapa Nui (2008)
 A Profound Path (2013)
 The Waiting Soldier (2015)
 Krásná Hora (2019)
 Himmelfahrt (2020)

Compilations
 The Divine Comedy Part II - Purgatorio (2009; Musea)
 Rökstenen - A Tribute to Swedish Progressive Rock of the 70's (2009; Musea)
 The Divine Comedy Part III - Paradiso (2010; Musea)
 The Tales of Edgar Allan Poe (2010; Musea)
 The Stories of H.P. Lovecraft (2012; Musea)
 Decamerone - Ten Days In 100 Novellas Part III (2016; Colossus/Just for Kicks)
 Live-Session at ORF Radiokulturhaus (2018; Melodic Revolution Records)

References

External links
 

Art rock musical groups
Austrian progressive rock groups